Epicrocis picta is a species of snout moth in the genus Epicrocis. It was described by Boris Balinsky in 1991 and is known from South Africa and Namibia.

References

Moths described in 1991
Phycitini
Insects of Namibia
Moths of Africa